Peter Wehle (9 May 1914 – 18 May 1986) was an Austrian actor, writer, composer and cabaret performer.

Selected filmography
 The Singing House (198)
 Dear Friend (1949)
 Mikosch, the Pride of the Company (1958)

References

Bibliography 
 Robert von Dassanowsky. Austrian Cinema: A History. McFarland, 2005.

External links 
 

1914 births
1986 deaths
Austrian male film actors
Austrian composers
Male actors from Vienna
20th-century Austrian screenwriters
20th-century Austrian male writers